John Edward Arigho (July 10, 1907 – November 29, 1999) was an international rugby union player for Ireland. He played 16 caps between 1928–1931 and scored 6 international tries playing on the wing. He also played for Lansdowne Football Club.

References

1907 births
1999 deaths
Ireland international rugby union players
People educated at Castleknock College
Rugby union wings